The European Association for Banking and Financial History (eabh) is an independent, non-profit association based in Frankfurt am Main. Founded in 1990, the eabh aims to promote research on banking history; support the preservation historically valuable archive material of public and private banking institutions; and facilitate dialogue on key challenges and opportunities to the historical study of finance, insurance, and globalization. It maintains a global network of financial professionals and academics who meet to discuss and encourage projects in the field of financial and banking history. The eabh currently has 80 member organisations.

Foundation 
The European Association for Banking History e.V. (eabh) was founded on 29 November 1990 in an inaugural meeting at the premises of Deutsche Bank, in Frankfurt am Main, by 22 banking institutions and one academic institution from 20 European countries. Manfred Pohl, German business historian and head of ‘Historisches Institut der Deutschen Bank’ (1972–2000), was the responsible for the creation of the forum that could lead to the foundation of the eabh. During the ‘European Colloquium on Banking History’ held in Frankfurt on 9 February 1989 Pohl launched the idea of creating an association for banking history and decided to gather European scholars and banking institutions’ archivists in a working group to draft the first statutes. Other members of the first eabh Board of Management were Wilfried Guth, chairman of the Board of Patrons; Sir Evelyn de Rothschild, chairman; Herman Van der Wee, Chairman of the Academic Advisory Council; Pedro Martinez Mendez, Treasurer and Robert Lion, Member.

Then president of De Nederlandsche Bank, Wim Duisenberg, opens the first annual eabh conference, ‘How to Write the History of a Bank’ on 16 September 1992. Two members of the eabh, Youssef Cassis and Philip L. Cottrell, subsequently begin the organisation's dedicated academic journal, the Financial History Review.

On 7 December 2000, the eabh celebrates its 10th anniversary at a Deutsche Bank symposium, 'Banking in the Mirror of Time’. On 28 May 2004 the Association conducted a general survey in the 15th General Members’ Meeting and decided to change its name to eabh (European Association for Banking and Financial History e.V.), as a commitment to embracing financial history in a wider sense. The founding members of the eabh board established the organization of 22 banks in 11 European countries.

In 2018, the eabh welcomed its first member institution on the African continent, the Banco de Moçambique.

Organization chart 
The General Members' Assembly is the supreme organ of the association and meets yearly. The eabh is governed by the Board of Management and advised by the Board of Patrons and the Academic Council. It has as well a General Secretariat, neuralgic centre of the eabh in charge of implementation, management and coordination of all the initiatives organised by the association and with seat in Frankfurt. The Secretary General acts as Executive Manager of the Association.

The Association's founder Manfred Pohl was Deputy Chairman of the Board of Management since 1990 and was elected Honorary Chairman for life in 2015. 
The eabh publishes studies and conference papers. It also organises numerous conferences, academic symposia, workshops and seminars in various European towns and locations. Every year they hold a main conference in which archivists, historians and representatives of the financial community from all over Europe come together to discuss matters of common interest.

Past presidents of the organization include:
 1990: Sir Evelyn de Rothschild, N M Rothschilds & Sons
 2004: Wim Duisenberg, President of the European Central Bank
 2006: Jean-Claude Trichet, President of the European Central Bank
 2012: Hugo Bänziger, (International Committee of the Red Cross)

Past Chairman of the eabh Academic Advisory Council include:
 1990: Herman Van der Wee, University of Leuven
 1998: Gabriel Tortella Casares, University of Alcalá, Madrid
 2004: Gerald D. Feldman, University of California, Berkeley
 2008: Peter Hertner, University of Halle-Wittenberg
 2013: Harold James, Princeton University

Activities

Archives
In July 2014 the eabh transferred its documents to the Historical Archives of the European Union (HAEU) in Florence. This material relates to the creation of the Association and includes the work of its governing bodies and its activities: workshop material, board meeting protocols, publication material and photographs.

Publications

The main publication of the eabh is the triannual Financial History Review (FHR), published in tandem with Cambridge University Press. Founded in 1994, the FHR is the sole academic journal dedicaetd to financial, banking and monetary history. It regulately publishes original research that discus the intersections of history, finance, public policy, culture, and society. Alongside the FHR, the eabh publishes a working paper series (since 2014), a book series, and a bulletin.

Conferences
The eabh hosts a number of conferences and workshops designed to bring together academics and scholars of financial and banking history. Often these conferences are co-sponsored with other non-profits, business organizations, corporations, central banks, or commercial banks. The discussions at these conferences aim to contribute to ongoing policy debates. Recent conferences include:
October 2019, Minting History: Financial history at face value, with the Rothschild Archive
October 2018, Institutional Investors: The history of professional fund management, with Schroders and Banque Lombard Odier
October 2017, Money in Africa: Monetary and financial decolonisation in Africa in the 20th Century, with the Banco de Portugal and Banque de France
June 2017, Legacy of finance: The legacy of the haute-banque in the world. From the 19th to the 21st century, with BNP Paribas
May 2017, Innovation in archives & Innovative responses to financial crises, with the Federal Reserve Bank of St. Louis
June 2012, European Association for Banking and Financial History Annual Conference, with National Bank of Romania

See also

Organizations
 Business History Conference
 Economic History Association
 Economic History Society
 International Economic History Association

Publications
 Business History Review
 Economic History Review
 Enterprise & Society
 Journal of Economic History

References

External links 
 Website of the eabh (The European Association for Banking and Financial History e.V.)

Research institutes established in 1990
Organisations based in Frankfurt
Banking organizations
History of banking
Economic history societies
Economic history journals
History of business
Business and finance professional associations
1990 establishments in Germany